The School of Psychological Sciences at the University of Manchester, was one of five schools which make up the Faculty of Medical and Human Sciences. The Victoria University of Manchester (VUM) was the first university in Britain to appoint a full-time Professor of Psychology in 1919.   The present School was founded by the bringing together of the Human Communication and Deafness Group (HCD), the Department of Psychology and the Division of Clinical Psychology in 2004 when the University of Manchester was formed by the merger of VUM and UMIST.  The school was currently divided into three divisions: Psychology, Clinical Psychology, Audiology & Deafness. T. H. Pear was Professor of Psychology from 1919 to 1951.

Research 
The school was also organised into five across-division research groups: Audiology & Deafness, Clinical & Health Psychology, Clinical Neuroscience & Language Disorders, Cognition & Cognitive Neuroscience, and Language & Communication.

References

External links 
 School of Psychological Sciences Homepage

Psychology